Archdale is a surname. Notable people with the surname include:

John Archdale (1642–1717) colonial Governor of North Carolina and Governor of South Carolina
Sir Edward Archdale, 1st Baronet (1853–1943), MP for North Fermanagh 1898–1903 and 1916–1921
Sir Edward Archdale, 3rd Baronet (1921–2009), Royal Navy officer
Mervyn Edward Archdale
William Humphrys Archdale

The surname can also be spelled Archdall

English-language surnames
Surnames of British Isles origin